Southeastern High School is a public high school in Chillicothe, Ohio.  It is the only high school in the Southeastern Local School District.  Their nickname is the Panthers. They are in the Scioto Valley Conference. The school is located on  2003 Lancaster Road, Chillicothe, Ohio.

History
In October 1935, the district board decided on an expected 12-acre plot on Lancaster Road for the six-year Southeastern rural high school. About a half year later, a new structure for the Southeastern rural high school was selected on April 10, 1936, on the Caldwell Farm at the corner of Higby Road and the Chesapeake & Ohio Railway.

Principal Leonard Steyer
Superintendent Brian Justice

Athletics

Scioto Valley Conference
 Bainbridge Paint Valley Bearcats
 Chillicothe Unioto Sherman Tanks
 Chillicothe Zane Trace Pioneers
 Frankfort Adena Warriors
 Huntington Ross Huntington Huntsmen
 Piketon Redstreaks
 Richmond Dale/Chillicothe Southeastern Panthers
 Williamsport Westfall Mustangs

See also Ohio High School Athletic Conferences

Their football/track stadium is named R.L. Davisson Memorial Stadium, named after a teacher that taught there.

The Panthers are very bad at sports generally however every 8-9 years they have a good season.

Southeastern's record against Unioto is 18-27-1. Their last win came in 2019.

References

External links
 District Website

High schools in Ross County, Ohio
Public high schools in Ohio